In algebraic geometry, a geometric quotient of an algebraic variety X with the action of an algebraic group G is a morphism of varieties  such that
(i) For each y in Y, the fiber  is an orbit of G.
(ii) The topology of Y is the quotient topology: a subset  is open if and only if  is open.
(iii) For any open subset ,  is an isomorphism. (Here, k is the base field.)

The notion appears in geometric invariant theory. (i), (ii) say that Y is an orbit space of X in topology. (iii) may also be phrased as an isomorphism of sheaves . In particular, if X is irreducible, then so is Y and : rational functions on Y may be viewed as invariant rational functions on X (i.e., rational-invariants of X).

For example, if H is a closed subgroup of G, then  is a geometric quotient. A GIT quotient may or may not be a geometric quotient: but both are categorical quotients, which is unique; in other words, one cannot have both types of quotients (without them being the same).

Relation to other quotients 

A geometric quotient is a categorical quotient. This is proved in Mumford's geometric invariant theory.

A geometric quotient is precisely a good quotient whose fibers are orbits of the group.

Examples 
 The canonical map  is a geometric quotient.
 If L is a linearized line bundle on an algebraic G-variety X, then, writing  for the set of stable points with respect to L, the quotient
  
is a geometric quotient.

References 

Algebraic geometry